Commercial passenger airliners and cargo aircraft have been the subject of plots or attacks by bombs and fire since near the start of air travel. Many early bombings were suicides or schemes for insurance money, but in the latter part of the 20th century, assassination and political and religious militant terrorism became the dominant motive for attacking large jets. One list describes 86 cases related to airliner bombings, 53 of them resulting in deaths.

This is a chronological list of airliner bombing attacks. All entries on the list should have their own article. Explosions deemed to have not resulted from a bomb should not be included on this list. Bombings of small light aircraft and air taxis and failed bombing plots may not be notable for inclusion. Commercial airliners contracted to military use may be included on this list, but bombings of military transport aircraft should not.

For airliners brought down by gunfire or missile attacks rather than terrorist bombings or sabotage, see List of airliner shootdown incidents.


List of incidents

See also
 Aviation accidents and incidents
 List of terrorist incidents

Notes

External links
 Commercial Airliner Bombings
 A Chronology of Aviation Terrorism 1968-2004 

 
Terrorism-related lists